Yser (French) or IJzer (Dutch) is a Brussels Metro station on the northern segment of lines 2 and 6. It opened on 2 October 1988 and is located under the Small Ring (Brussels' inner ring road) between the / and the / in the municipality of the City of Brussels, Belgium. Its name derives from the river Yser.

Brussels metro stations
Railway stations opened in 1988
City of Brussels
1988 establishments in Belgium